The 2019 Football Championship of Chernihiv Oblast was won by FC Chernihiv.

League table

 FC Chernihiv also played in the 2019–20 Ukrainian Football Amateur League.

References

Football
Chernihiv
Chernihiv